The Barkakana–Son Nagar line is an Indian railway line connecting Barkakana and Son Nagar on the Gaya–Mughalsarai section of the Grand Chord. This  track is under the jurisdiction of East Central Railway.

History 
In 1902, a branch line of EIR was opened from Sone East Bank (later renamed Son Nagar) to Daltonganj. With the development of South Karanpura Coalfield, the Central India Coalfields Railway opened a line from Gomoh to Barkakana in 1927 and from Barkakana to Daltonganj in 1929. These lines were subsequently taken over by EIR.

Bridging the Soane/Son 
It was opened for traffic on 27 February 1900. When it was built, it was the longest bridge in India and was believed to be the second-longest bridge in the world, short of the Tay Bridge near Dundee. Subsequently, longer road bridges were built but it remained the longest rail bridge in India for many years. The opening of the 4.62 km Vembanad Rail Bridge, connecting the Container Transshipment Terminal on Vallarpadam Island to Edappally, in February 2011, pushed it to the second position.

Freight corridor 
Son Nagar is expected to be connected with Ludhiana as part of the Eastern Corridor. The primary feeder routes for this will be from Sonnagar to Durgapur via Gomoh, Sonnagar to Tatanagar via Garhwa Road, and Barkakana to Bokaro via Chandrapura.

Railway reorganisation 
In 1952, Eastern Railway, Northern Railway and North Eastern Railway were formed. Eastern Railway was formed with a portion of East Indian Railway Company, east of Mughalsarai and Bengal Nagpur Railway. Northern Railway was formed with a portion of East Indian Railway Company west of Mughalsarai, Jodhpur Railway, Bikaner Railway and Eastern Punjab Railway. North Eastern Railway was formed with Oudh and Tirhut Railway, Assam Railway and a portion of Bombay, Baroda and Central India Railway. East Central Railway was created in 1996–97.

References 

5 ft 6 in gauge railways in India
Railway lines in Bihar
Railway lines in Uttar Pradesh
Railway lines opened in 1907

Transport in Gaya, India
Transport in Mughalsarai